Lohrbach is a river of Rhineland-Palatinate, Germany.

The Lohrbach springs west of Kordel. It discharges south of Kordel, west of Ramstein Castle from the left into the Kyll.

See also
List of rivers of Rhineland-Palatinate

References

Rivers of Rhineland-Palatinate
Rivers of Germany